Song is a town, and the capital of the Song District (3,935.2 square kilometers) in Kapit Division, Sarawak, Malaysia. The district population was 20,046 according to the 2010 census. Song is situated by the banks of the Katibas River, a tributary of the Rajang River. It is an important stopover for river traffic going up the Rajang River.

Etymology
The district was originally named by the Kayan people as long which means river stream. After the Kayan people was defeated by the Iban people, the Ibans decided to rename the place after an Iban warrior named Song who led them to victory against the Kayans. Another version of the origin of the name Song came from the legend of the Melanau people. There was once a Melanau widow named Song who came from Nangka village, Sibu. She went to the present day Song river mouth for agriculture. Her relatives would frequently visit her. When they ask her which place she would like to go, she would said "to Rumah Song " (her own home). Thus the area is called Song since then.

History

The Kayan people were the first group of settlers inhabited the Song District. At that time, the Kayans were the nomadic people. At the same time, the Iban people migrated from the present day Kalimantan, Indonesia and settled near the banks of the Katibas River (located in the Song District) in order to find land for farming. However, conflict between the Kayan and the Iban people soon grew into a war and the Iban people won. Accepting defeat, the Kayan people then migrated to Belaga District.

The Malays and the Chinese first arrived in Song District in the 1800s. They built wooden shophouses with nipah roofs along the river banks and opened floating shops on the river. Initially, the barter system was used, but when Song was acquired by the Kingdom of Sarawak, a monetary system was introduced. The first three Malays to arrive in Song were Mr Haji Tahir, Haji Omar, and Haji Dollah. In 1870, the Brooke government built a fort at Nanga Song (mouth of Song river). The fort also functioned as the first administrative centre for Song and was intended to inhibit Iban uprisings at Katibas river. The Iban people opposed the introduction of the assessment tax by the Brooke government. Such uprisings lasted until the 1900s. In 1873, Sibu Division was established. Kapit and Song sub-district were included in the division at that time. In 1937, there were 10 Malay houses in Song. The Malay traders at Song were known as Abang (meaning "nobleman"). In the 1820s, they traded with the Ibans in Song in exchange for jungle produce. One of the well-known traders was Haji Ahmed bin Haji Omar. The Malays would sell the jungle produce in Sibau town (present-day Sibu) for a profit. Ships like "Ang Bee" from Singapore and "Kampar" from the Malay Peninsula would anchor in Sibu to carry the jungle produce back to their respective destinations for sale. In exchange, these ships brought daily necessities such as salt, sugar, salted fish, plates, bowls, pottery and clothes to trade with the natives. Meanwhile, the Iban people worked as farmers, rubber tappers and jungle produce collectors. The Ibans then sold their products at the Song bazaar in exchange for daily necessities.

During the Japanese occupation, both Allied and Japanese bombings destroyed many of the buildings in the village. Many residents fled Song due to the war. The town became chaotic during the war and its people endured harsh Japanese administration. During this time, the Chinese started to build the first primary school in Song. After the war, the British colonial government gave Sarawak dollars to residents of Song to rebuild their homes. In 1948, the fort at Nanga Song was moved to Nanga Katibas (mouth of Katibas river). Thus, the administrative centre at Song river was effectively moved to Katibas river. The Chinese also restarted their businesses in Song after the war.

During the British colonial era, the Sarawak Natives Affairs Department was established in 1955. Michael Sardin became the first native officer. During the Indonesia–Malaysia confrontation, Song sub-district office was the operational centre to repel Indonesian military crossings of the Sarawak-Kalimantan border. After the formation of Malaysia in 1963, William Linang became the first Sarawak Administrative Officer (SAO) in Song. On 2 April 1973, Kapit was upgraded to division. At the same time, Song sub-district was upgraded into a district. In 1977, the administrative centre of Song was moved from the fort at Katibas river to the town centre.

Government
Song District Office governs an area of 38,934 km2.

Geography and climate
Song is one of three districts located within Kapit Division. The other two districts are: Kapit District and Belaga District. Rajang River is the main river crossing the Song District. Other rivers that cross the district are: Katibas river, Song river, Iran river, Manap river, Lajan river and Lijau river. These rivers are the main transportation routes for Song residents. 90% of the Song district is covered with uneven highlands,

Demographics
In 2010, Song District had a population of 20,046. The Iban people accounted for 80% of the district population, followed by Chinese, Melanau people, Malay and Bidayuh.

Economy

Transport
There are hourly express boat services connecting Song, Sibu, Kanowit, Kapit and Belaga. It is approximately 2 hours journey from Sibu and an hour from Kapit. The express boats services are provided frequently at Song Wharf Terminal.
However, a plan to build roads connecting Song to Kapit and Song to Kanowit was promised by the Federal Government and was announced by the Prime Minister of Malaysia during his visit to the town on 15 April 2011.

The bus express of Sibu-Song-Kapit is available since 2022.

Bus Express

Other utilities

Education
Secondary Schools:
SMK Song
SMK Katibas

Primary Schools :

SK (C) Hin Hua 
SK(known as SRB Cardinal Vaughan Song)
SK Nanga Beguang
SK NangaTemalat
SK Nanga Bangkit
SK Ulu Melipis
SK Nanga Selibut
SK Tan Sri Datuk Temenggong Jugah
SK Nanga Nansang
SK Nanga Musah
SK Nanga Janan
SK Nanga Engkuah
SK Nanga Embuau
SK Nanga Dalai
SK Nanga Nyimoh
SK Lubok Ipoh
SK Lubok Bedil

Healthcare

Culture and leisure

References

Song District
Towns in Sarawak